James I. Newton, known as Jimmy Newton and Jack Newton (born 1898) was an English professional footballer who played as a goalkeeper.

Career
Born in Horsforth, Newton spent his early career with Anderston Victoria, Glasgow Perthshire, and Rutherglen Glencairn. He then played for Queen's Park between 1921 and 1923. He joined Bradford City in June 1923, making 5 league appearances for the club. He left the club in May 1924 to sign for Halifax Town. He later played for Coventry City, Brighton & Hove Albion, Otley and Burley Grove United.

Sources

References

1898 births
Year of death missing
English footballers
Glasgow Perthshire F.C. players
Rutherglen Glencairn F.C. players
Queen's Park F.C. players
Bradford City A.F.C. players
Halifax Town A.F.C. players
Coventry City F.C. players
Brighton & Hove Albion F.C. players
Scottish Football League players
English Football League players
Association football goalkeepers